Issa Laye Lucas Jean Diop (born 9 January 1997) is a French professional footballer who plays as a centre-back for  club Fulham.

Diop began his career at his hometown club Toulouse, making his senior debut during the 2015–16 season. He became the club's captain in 2017, before leaving for English club West Ham United in 2018, signing for a club-record fee.

Club career

Toulouse
Diop was born in Toulouse, Haute-Garonne and played youth football for Balma SC before moving to Toulouse FC in 2006. He began training with the first team in September 2015, and signed a professional contract in November. He was part of an influx of young players to the squad that included Alban Lafont, Zinédine Machach, Alexis Blin and Yann Bodiger.

He made his Ligue 1 debut, aged 18, on 28 November 2015 against Nice, playing the full game alongside fellow debutant Lafont. He scored his first goal in his second appearance on 2 December 2015, contributing to his club's 3–0 win away to fellow relegation strugglers Troyes. He made 21 appearances in his first season, helping the club to eight clean sheets. He was sent off twice during a season in which the club only avoided relegation with a win on the final day.

Diop made 30 Ligue 1 appearances in 2016–17. He was named captain of his local club for the first time in April 2017.

The 2017–18 season saw Diop become club captain in October. Toulouse reached the quarter-finals of the Coupe de France, but again struggled in the league, avoiding relegation after a play-off victory against AC Ajaccio in May 2018.

West Ham United

On 19 June 2018, Premier League club West Ham United confirmed the transfer of Diop, who signed a five-year contract. The fee, reported by British media as £22 million, was not disclosed but was announced as a club record, beating the previous record of £20 million set in July 2017 with the signing of Marko Arnautović. Diop made his Premier League and West Ham debut on 25 August. In a 3–1 away defeat by Arsenal, he scored an own goal and in doing so became the first West Ham player to score an own goal on his debut in the Premier League. Three days later, Diop scored his first goal for the club, in an EFL Cup game against AFC Wimbledon after conceding a goal after only 72 seconds, Diop scored an equalising goal for West Ham who went on to win 3–1. He won early season praise for his performances particularly against Arsenal and against Manchester United whose manager, José Mourinho commended Diop's performance in West Ham's 3–1 win over his club and of the scout who had identified the potential of Diop. On 22 February 2019, Diop scored his first Premier League goal in a 3–1 home win against Fulham.

On 22 September 2020, Diop was pulled from the West Ham squad before their EFL Cup game against Hull City after testing positive for COVID-19. On 9 February 2021, in a FA Cup game against Manchester United, Diop became the first concussion substitute in English football when he was replaced by Ryan Fredericks following a head injury. The club subsequently reported that Diop had suffered no adverse effects, with manager David Moyes praising the club's medical staff for the way they handled Diop's injury. Although initially a regular player for West Ham, following the arrival of Craig Dawson and Kurt Zouma in the 2021-22 season, Diop was picked less often.  Before transferring to Fulham in August 2022, Diop made 121 appearances for West Ham scoring eight goals.

Fulham
On 10 August 2022, Diop transferred permanently to Fulham on a five-year contract for an undisclosed fee. Diop made his Fulham debut on 23 August in a 2-0 away defeat to League Two team, Crawley Town in the League Cup second round. Diop scored his first goal for Fulham on 15 October in a 2-2 draw at home to AFC Bournemouth.

International career
Diop has been a youth international for France at every level, making his first appearance for France U16 in 2013. He was part of the team that won the 2016 UEFA European Under-19 Championship, scoring in the final. In addition to winning the tournament itself, Diop was also named in the Team of the Tournament.

He made his debut for France U21 in a qualification game for the 2017 UEFA European Under-21 Championship, against Ukraine on 2 September 2016.

He is also eligible to play for Morocco through his mother and for Senegal through his father. In October 2018, he confirmed his international commitment to France.

Style of play
He has played mainly as a right-sided centre-back. Along with the two red cards received in 2015–16, Diop amassed 25 yellow cards over the course of his three seasons at Toulouse.

Personal life
Diop's grandfather, Lybasse Diop, played for Bordeaux and was the first Senegalese footballer in Ligue 1. He is also of Moroccan descent through his mother.

Career statistics

Club

Honours
France U19
UEFA European Under-19 Championship: 2016

Individual
UEFA European Under-19 Championship Team of the Tournament: 2016

References

External links

Profile at the Fulham F.C. website
 
 
 
 

1997 births
Living people
Footballers from Toulouse
French footballers
France youth international footballers
France under-21 international footballers
Association football defenders
Balma SC players
Toulouse FC players
West Ham United F.C. players
Fulham F.C. players
Championnat National 3 players
Ligue 1 players
Premier League players
French expatriate footballers
Expatriate footballers in England
French expatriate sportspeople in England
Black French sportspeople
French sportspeople of Moroccan descent
French sportspeople of Senegalese descent